is a Japanese footballer who plays for Avispa Fukuoka.

Career
While attending Fukuoka University, Nagaishi was signed as a special designated player by Sagan Tosu. Yet Cerezo Osaka actually called Nagaishi to be on the bench in the opening game of 2015 season and the pink side of Osaka then signed him as a special designated player in May 2017.

Club statistics
.

References

External links

Profile at J. League
Profile at Avispa Fukuoka

1996 births
Living people
Fukuoka University alumni
Association football people from Yamaguchi Prefecture
Japanese footballers
J1 League players
J2 League players
J3 League players
Sagan Tosu players
Cerezo Osaka players
Cerezo Osaka U-23 players
Renofa Yamaguchi FC players
Avispa Fukuoka players
Association football forwards